Dharmapuri is a  ward in Oulgaret Municipality of  Pondicherry district in the Indian union territory of Puducherry.

Demographics
This ward has government fair price shop,Anganwadi Centre catering amenities to women and child in this ward, one Government Primary School & High School for serving the general public of this ward. This ward comes under oulgaret municipality and is also a hamlet in thattanchavaday Revenue Village of oulgaret taluk.

after delimitation in 2019 the population of ward dharmapuri is 8666 and ward number is 30. There is a children park at Dr.Puratchithalainagar 3rd cross and an overhead water tank which acts as a major source of supply providing metered water connection though the government of puducherry.a temple for wisdom named "gnalayam" is also available in this locality. around 3 to 4 marriage halls arae available in this ward.the government primary school dharmapuri and government high school are located in the same complex in vazhudavour road opposite to sri ram thirumanamandapam.most of the population here are non agricultural workers.

Temples
 Sri dhrowbathiamman Temple
 Hanuman Temple
 Sri angalamman temple
 Gangaiamman temple

Sources
 http://pandr.puducherry.gov.in/Plan%20Formulation/Plan%20Document/DAP%202002-03/pdffiles/scp/23-43.pdf
 http://statistics.puducherry.gov.in/abstract2005-06/Appendix%20II/wardwise_population.pdf 

Cities and towns in Puducherry district